The 2011 Southern Conference football season began on Thursday, September 1, 2011 with Western Carolina visiting Georgia Southern.  The season ended in the semifinals of the NCAA Division I Football Championship, with Georgia Southern losing to North Dakota State.

Preseason
New coaches - Furman

Preseason Poll Results
First place votes in parentheses

Preseason All-Conference Teams
Offensive Player of the Year: Eric Breitenstein, Jr., FB, Wofford
Co-Defensive Players of the Year: Ameet Pall, Sr., DL, Wofford & Brent Russell, Jr., DL, Georgia Southern

Rankings

Regular season 

All times Eastern time.

Rankings reflect that of the Sports Network poll for that week.

Week One 

Players of the week:

Week Two 

Players of the week:

Week Three

Players of the week:

Week Four

Players of the week:

Week Five

Players of the week:

Week Six

Players of the week:

Week Seven

Players of the week:

Week Eight

Players of the week:

Week Nine

Players of the week:

Week Ten

Players of the week:

Week Eleven

Players of the week:

Week Twelve

Players of the week:

Playoffs Second Round

Playoffs Quarterfinals

Playoffs Semifinals

Attendance

Post-season awards and honors

References